Commission scolaire de l'Énergie was a francophone school district in the Mauricie region Quebec, headquartered in Shawinigan.
In 2020, the school board was replaced by the centre de services scolaire de l'Énergie.

References

External links
 Commission scolaire de l'Énergie 

Historical school districts in Quebec
Education in Mauricie